"Hypnotized" is a 2007 song by rapper Big Gemini, and the only single off the album History in the Making. It charted on Billboard Rhythmic Top 40.

Remix

A remix was made in 2008, which featured Flo Rida and Lil Rob.

References

2007 singles
2007 songs